Cornelius Bumpus (May 7, 1945 – February 3, 2004) was an American woodwind, brass and keyboard player and vocalist from Santa Cruz, California.

Biography
Bumpus began his musical career playing alto saxophone at ten for his school band, and by age twelve he was playing at Luso-American dances. He attended Santa Cruz High School where he performed in the band and won the John Philip Sousa Award. He also played school dances with his own band, Corny and the Corvettes. In 1966 he was in Bobby Freeman's band and after that he began his association with many well-known groups.
 
His role in these bands was primarily as a saxophonist and organist. His most notable touring was with the Doobie Brothers and Steely Dan. Bumpus toured with Steely Dan from 1993 to 2003. In 2002, he worked on the Big Blue Earth project sponsored by the Church of Christ, Scientist. During the 1980s, Bumpus enjoyed a short tenure with Café Society, a Los Angeles pop band, in which he played in a horn section with the trombonist Dan Levine and trumpeter Anne Petereit King.

In 1981, Bumpus issued his first solo LP, A Clear View, which featured his singing, writing and sax playing, stretching out with the band on several, long, jazzy jams over six minutes each.

Bumpus suffered a heart attack on February 3, 2004, while on an airline flight from New York to California, where he was scheduled to perform at the Columbia College Jazz Concert Series. The plane made an emergency landing in Sioux City, Iowa, so he could get medical assistance, but Bumpus had died by the time the plane reached the ground. He was 58 at the time of his death.

Discography
With Clifford Coulter
 East Side San Jose (Impulse!, 1970)

With The Doobie Brothers
 One Step Closer (Warner Bros., 1980)
 Farewell Tour (Warner Bros., 1983)
 Rockin' down the Highway: The Wildlife Concert (Sony, 1996)

With Donald Fagen
 Kamakiriad (Reprise, 1993)

With Moby Grape
 Live Grape (Escape, 1978)

With Steely Dan
 Alive in America (Giant, 1995)

References

External links

1945 births
2004 deaths
Musicians from Santa Cruz, California
African-American woodwind musicians
American saxophonists
American male saxophonists
20th-century American keyboardists
Palmetto Records artists
The Doobie Brothers members
20th-century American musicians
20th-century saxophonists
20th-century American male musicians
Santa Cruz High School alumni
The New York Rock and Soul Revue members